The 2015–16 Idaho Vandals women's basketball team represented the University of Idaho during the 2015–16 NCAA Division I women's basketball season. The Vandals, led by eighth year head coach Jon Newlee, played their home games at the Cowan Spectrum with a five early season games at Memorial Gym, and were members of the Big Sky Conference. They finished the season 24–10, 13–5 in Big Sky play to finish in a 3 way tie for second place. They won the Big Sky tournament for the first time since 1985 when they rejoin the Big Sky Conference since 2014 and earn an automatic trip to the NCAA women's tournament where they lost in the first round to Baylor.

Roster

Schedule

|-
!colspan=9 style="background:#B18E5F; color:#000000;"| Exhibition

|-
!colspan=9 style="background:#B18E5F; color:#000000;"| Non-conference regular season

|-
!colspan=9 style="background:#B18E5F; color:#000000;"| Big Sky regular season

|-
!colspan=9 style="background:#B18E5F; color:#000000;"| Big Sky Women's Tournament

|-
!colspan=9 style="background:#B18E5F; color:#000000;"| NCAA Women's Tournament

Rankings

See also
2015–16 Idaho Vandals men's basketball team

References

Idaho Vandals women's basketball seasons
Idaho
Idaho
Van
Van